The 2003 IRL Infiniti Pro Series Season was the series' second. It consisted of 12 races and the champion was Mark Taylor who won 7 of 12 races and only suffered 2 DNF's and 1 DNS. All teams used Dallara chassis and Infiniti engines. Only 7 drivers competed in every race and 3 more missed a single race.

Team and driver chart

Race Calendar

Championship standings

Drivers' Championship 

 Scoring system

 The driver who qualifies on pole is awarded one additional point.
 An additional point is awarded to the driver who leads the most laps in a race.

Complete Overview

R9=retired, but classified NS13=did not start, but classified

References

Indy Lights seasons
Indy Pro Series
Infiniti Pro